Chrysallida bjoernssoni is a species of sea snail, a marine gastropod mollusk in the family Pyramidellidae, the pyrams and their allies. The species is one of many species within the Chrysallida genus of gastropods.

Distribution
This species occurs in the following locations:
 European waters (ERMS scope), formerly the Mediterranean Sea.

References

External links
 To CLEMAM
 To Encyclopedia of Life
 To World Register of Marine Species

bjoernssoni
Gastropods described in 1991